Monda River, also Monga River (Río Monga) and Manga River (Río Manga) is a river in the area of Sabá, Colón Department, Honduras.

References

Rivers of Honduras